The China Railways People (人民) type steam locomotive (transliteration Ren Min: RM) was a type of 4-6-2 mainline general purpose steam locomotive.

Preservation 

RM-1001 is preserved at the China Railway Museum.
RM-1163 is preserved at Aioi, Japan.
RM-1247 is preserved at Shenyang Railway Museum.

In fiction
In the 2016 animated film Thomas & Friends: The Great Race, the 2018 animated film Thomas & Friends: Big World! Big Adventures! and Thomas & Friends Series 22, 23 and 24, a Chinese character named Yong Bao was based on the RM Class.

See also 
China Railways JS
China Railways SL6
China Railways SL7

Notes

References

Steam locomotives of China
CSR Sifang Co Ltd.
Standard gauge locomotives of China
Railway locomotives introduced in 1958
Passenger locomotives
4-6-2 locomotives